Paramaenas nephelistis is a moth of the family Erebidae. It was described by George Hampson in 1907. It is found in Angola, Kenya and South Africa.

Subspecies
Paramaenas nephelistis nephelistis
Paramaenas nephelistis diaphana (Rothschild, 1933)
Paramaenas nephelistis hecate (Fawcett, 1916)

References

Spilosomina
Moths described in 1907